Windows 10 has several editions, all with varying feature sets, use cases, or intended devices. Certain editions are distributed only on devices directly from an original equipment manufacturer (OEM), while editions such as Enterprise and Education are only available through volume licensing channels. Microsoft also makes editions of Windows 10 available to device manufacturers for use on specific classes of devices, including IoT devices and previously marketed Windows 10 Mobile for smartphones.

Baseline editions 
Baseline editions are the only editions available as standalone purchases in retail outlets. PCs often come pre-installed with one of these editions.

 
 Windows 10 Home is designed for use in PCs, tablets and 2-in-1 PCs. It includes all features directed at consumers.

 
 Windows 10 Pro includes all features of Windows 10 Home, with additional capabilities that are oriented towards professionals and business environments, such as Active Directory, Remote Desktop, BitLocker, Hyper-V, and Windows Defender Device Guard.

 
 Windows 10 Pro for Workstations is designed for high-end hardware for intensive computing tasks and supports Intel Xeon, AMD Opteron and the latest AMD Epyc processors; up to four CPUs; up to 6 TB RAM; the ReFS file system; Non-Volatile Dual In-line Memory Module (NVDIMM); and remote direct memory access (RDMA).

Organizational editions 

These editions add features to facilitate centralized control of many installations of the OS within an organization. The main avenue of acquiring them is a volume licensing contract with Microsoft.

 
 Windows 10 Education is distributed through Academic Volume Licensing. It was based on Windows 10 Enterprise and initially reported to have the same feature set. As of version 1709, however, this edition has fewer features. See  for details.
 
 This edition was introduced in July 2016 for hardware partners on new devices purchased with the discounted K–12 academic license. It was based on the Pro edition of Windows 10 and contains mostly the same features as Windows 10 Pro with different options disabled by default, and adds options for setup and deployment in an education environment. It also features a "Set Up School PCs" app that allows provisioning of settings using a USB flash drive, and does not include Cortana, Microsoft Store suggestions, Windows Sandbox, or Windows Spotlight.
 
 Windows 10 Enterprise provides all the features of Windows 10 Pro for Workstations, with additional features to assist with IT-based organizations. Windows 10 Enterprise is configurable on two servicing channels, Semi-Annual Channel and Windows Insider Program.
 
 Enterprise LTSC (Long-Term Servicing Channel) (formerly LTSB, Long-Term Servicing Branch) is a long-term support variant of Windows 10 Enterprise released every 2 to 3 years. Each release is supported with security updates for either 5 or 10 years after its release, and intentionally receive no feature updates. Some features, including the Microsoft Store and bundled apps, are not included in this edition.  However, Windows Store can be installed using a command prompt. This edition was first released as Windows 10 Enterprise LTSB (Long-Term Servicing Branch). There are currently 4 releases of LTSC: one in 2015 (version 1507), one in 2016 (version 1607), one in 2018 (labeled as 2019, version 1809), and one in 2021 (version 21H2).

S mode 
Since 2018, OEMs can ship Windows 10 Home and Pro in a feature-limited variation named S mode which evolved from the discontinued Windows 10 S. Organizations employing Windows 10 Enterprise or Windows 10 Education can make use of S mode too. S mode is a feature-limited edition of Windows 10 designed primarily for low-end devices in the education market. It has a faster initial setup and login process, and allows devices to be provisioned using a USB drive with the "Set Up School PCs" app. 

With the exception of the Microsoft Teams desktop client which was made available for S mode in April 2019, the installation of software (both Universal Windows Platform (UWP) and Windows API apps) is only possible through the Microsoft Store, and command line programs or shells (even from Microsoft Store) are not allowed. System settings are locked to allow only Microsoft Edge as the default web browser with Bing as its search engine. The operating system may be switched out of S mode using the Microsoft Store for free. However, once S Mode is turned off, it cannot be re-enabled. All Windows 10 devices in S mode include a free one-year subscription to Minecraft: Education Edition. Critics have compared the edition to Windows RT, and have considered it to be an alternative to ChromeOS.

Device-specific editions 
These editions are licensed to OEMs only, and are primarily obtained via the purchase of hardware that includes it:

 
 A specific edition used by Microsoft's HoloLens mixed reality smartglasses.

 
 A rebranded variant of Microsoft's earlier embedded operating systems, Windows Embedded. Designed specifically for use in small footprint, low-cost devices and IoT scenarios. IoT Core was discontinued on October 11, 2020.

 
 A specific edition used by Microsoft's Surface Hub interactive whiteboard.

Discontinued editions 
The following editions of Windows 10 were discontinued (as of Windows 10 version 21H2).  For both Mobile and Mobile Enterprise, Microsoft confirmed it was exiting the consumer mobile devices market, so no successor product is available.
 
 Windows 10 Mobile was designed for smartphones and small tablets. It included all basic consumer features, including Continuum capability. It was the de facto successor of Windows Phone 8.1 and Windows RT. 
 
 Windows 10 Mobile Enterprise provided all of the features in Windows 10 Mobile, with additional features to assist IT-based organizations, in a manner similar to Windows 10 Enterprise, but optimized for mobile devices.
 
 A binary equivalent of Windows 10 Mobile Enterprise licensed for IoT applications. Also known as IoT Mobile Enterprise.

 Windows 10 S was an edition released in 2017 which ultimately evolved into the so-called S mode of Windows 10. In March 2018, Microsoft announced that it would be phasing out Windows 10 S, citing confusion among manufacturers and end-users.

 
 
Originally announced for use on dual-screen devices such as the Surface Neo and other potential form factors, 10X featured a modified user interface designed around context specific interactions or "postures" on such devices, including a redesigned Start menu with no tiles, and use of container technology to run Win32 software. The platform was described as a more direct competitor to ChromeOS. On May 4, 2020, Microsoft announced that Windows 10X would first be used on single-screen devices, and that they will "continue to look for the right moment, in conjunction with our OEM partners, to bring dual-screen devices to market". Microsoft also added anti-theft protection to Windows 10X, just like how Apple's Activation Lock and anti-theft protection on Android devices and Chromebooks work. On May 18, 2021, Head of Windows Servicing and Delivery John Cable stated that Windows 10X had been cancelled, and that its foundational technologies would be leveraged for future Microsoft products. Several design changes in 10X, notably the centered taskbar and redesigned start menu, would be later introduced in Windows 11.

Regional variations 
 
 As with previous versions of Windows since Windows XP, all Windows 10 editions for PC hardware have "N" and "KN" variations in Europe and South Korea that exclude multimedia functionality, in compliance with antitrust rulings. According to details that Microsoft has published, any app that relies on Microsoft multimedia technologies experiences impaired functionality on these editions, unable to even play audio notification tones. Restoring the missing functionality to these editions entails installing the "Media Feature Pack," followed by Skype, Movies & TV, Windows Media Player, Xbox Game Bar, Windows Voice Recorder, and four codecs. The variation cannot be changed without a clean install, and keys for one variation will not work on other variations.

 
 As with Windows 8.1, a reduced-price "Windows 10 with Bing" SKU is available to OEMs; it is subsidized by having Microsoft's Bing search engine set as default, which cannot be changed to a different search engine by OEMs. It is intended primarily for low-cost devices, and is otherwise identical to Windows 10 Home.

 
 In some emerging markets, OEMs preinstall a variation of Windows 10 Home called Single Language without the ability to switch the display language. It is otherwise identical to Windows 10 Home. To change display language, the user will need to upgrade to Windows 10 Home or Windows 10 Pro.

 
 In May 2017, it was reported that Microsoft, as part of its partnership with China Electronics Technology Group, created a specially-modified variant of Windows 10 Enterprise ("G") designed for use within branches of the Chinese government. This variant is pre-configured to "remove features that are not needed by Chinese government employees", and allow the use of its internal encryption algorithms.

Comparison chart 

Microsoft OEM licensing formula takes display size, RAM capacity and storage capacity into account. In mid-2015, devices with 4 GB RAM were expected to be $20 more expensive than devices with 2 GB RAM.

Upgrade path

Free upgrade 
At the time of launch, Microsoft deemed Windows 7 (with Service Pack 1) and Windows 8.1 users eligible to upgrade to Windows 10 free of charge, so long as the upgrade took place within one year of Windows 10's initial release date. Windows RT and the respective Enterprise editions of Windows 7, 8, and 8.1 were excluded from this offer.

Transition paths 
The following table summarizes possible transition paths (upgrade, downgrade, or migration) that can be taken, provided that proper licenses are purchased. 

Windows RT does not appear in this table because it cannot be upgraded to Windows 10.

Release branches 
New releases of Windows 10, called feature updates, are released twice a year as a free update for existing Windows 10 users. Each feature update contains new features and other changes to the operating system. The pace at which a system receives feature updates is dependent on the release branch from which the system downloads its updates. Windows 10 Pro, Enterprise and Education could optionally use a branch, which is defunct since version 1903, that received updates at a slower pace. These modes could be managed through system settings, Windows Server Update Services (WSUS), Windows Update for Business, Group Policy or through mobile device management systems such as Microsoft Intune.

 Windows 
 Windows Insider is a beta testing program that allows access to pre-release builds of Windows 10; it is designed to allow power users, developers, and vendors to test and provide feedback on future feature updates to Windows 10 as they are developed. Windows Insider itself consists of four "rings", "Fast" (which receives new builds as they are released), "Slow" (which receives new builds on a delay after it is deployed to Fast ring users), "Release Preview" (which receives early access to updates for the Current Branch), and formerly "Skip Ahead" (which receives super-early builds for the next feature update while a current release is being finished).
 
 The Current Branch (CB) distributed all feature updates as they graduate from the Windows Insider branch. Microsoft only supported the latest build. A feature update can be deferred for up to 365 days, while a quality update can be deferred for up to 30 days before it will be listed as available in Windows Update. As of version 1703, additional settings were provided to pause checking of updates for up to 35 days, but they were not available on Windows 10 Home. The branch was renamed to Semi-Annual Channel (Targeted) beginning with version 1709 before being merged to the Semi-Annual Channel since version 1903.
 
 The Current Branch for Business (CBB) distributed feature updates on a four-month delay from their original release to the Current Branch for Business, till version 1809. This allowed customers and vendors to evaluate and perform additional testing on new builds before broader deployments. Devices could be switched back to the Current Branch at any time. Before version 1903, the branch was not available on Windows 10 Home. This branch was renamed to Semi-Annual Channel (SAC) from version 1703 to version 21H1. It was later renamed again to General Availability Channel (GAC) since version 21H2.
  (LTSC)
 This servicing option is exclusively available for Windows 10 Enterprise, IoT Core, and IoT Enterprise LTSC editions. Distribution snapshots of these editions are updated every 2–3 years. LTSC builds adhere to Microsoft's traditional support policy which was in effect before Windows 10: They are not updated with new features, and are supported with critical updates for either five or ten years after their release. Microsoft officially discourages the use of LTSC outside of "special-purpose devices" that perform a fixed function and thus do not require new user experience features. As a result, it excludes Windows Store, most Cortana functionality, and most bundled apps (including Microsoft Edge). According to a Microsoft announcement, this servicing option was renamed from Long-Term Servicing Branch (LTSB) in 2016 to Long-Term Servicing Channel (LTSC) in 2018, to match the name changes mentioned above.

See also 
 Windows Server 2016, based on Windows 10 version 1607
 Windows Server 2019, based on Windows 10 version 1809
 Xbox system software, an operating system now based on the Windows 10 core, designed to run on consoles
 Windows 10 version history

Notes

References 

Windows 10